The Mann family is the most famous German novelists' dynasty.

History 
Originally the Manns were merchants, allegedly already in the 16th century in Nuremberg, documented since 1611 in Parchim, since 1713 in Rostock and since 1775 in Lübeck. There they became wealthy grain merchants, a Hanseatic family and as such members of the small ruling class of the Free City of Lübeck, a city republic and state of the German Empire. The symbol in the family's coat of arms is Mercury, the ancient god of commerce (as well as of eloquence).

The family's most famous member is Nobel Prize for Literature laureate Thomas Mann, who portrayed his own family and social class in the novel Buddenbrooks. In 1877, Thomas Mann's father Thomas Johann Heinrich Mann was elected Senator of Lübeck (corresponding to presiding minister of a government office in other German states).

Lineage 

 Johann Siegmund Mann (1761–1848), Lübeck merchant, married Anna Catharina Grotjan (1766–1842)
 Johann Siegmund Mann jr. (1797–1863), Lübeck merchant, married Emilie Wunderlich (1806–1833), second marriage from 1837 to Elisabeth Marty (1811–1890)
 Marie Elisabeth Amalia Mann (1838–1917), married Ernst Elfeld (1829–1912), Hamburg merchant; married secondly to Gustav Haag, Esslinger merchant
 Olga Catharina Elisabeth Elfeld
 Siegmund Christian Carl Elfeld
 Alice Haag
 Ewald Siegmund Henry Haag
 Johannes Mann (1842–1844)
 Olga Marie Mann (1845–1886), married Gustav Sievers, St. Petersburg merchant
 Friedrich Wilhelm Lebrecht Mann (1847–1926)
 Thomas Johann Heinrich Mann (1840–1891), Lübeck merchant and senator, married Júlia da Silva Bruhns (1851–1923)
 Luiz Heinrich Mann (1871–1950), author, president of the fine poetry division of the Prussian Academy of Arts, married Maria Kanová (1886–1947), divorced 1930, married from 1939 to Nelly Kröger (1898–1944)
 Carla Maria Henriette Leonie Mann (1916–1986), married Ludvík Aškenazy (1921–1986), author
  (born 1948), film maker and author
 Hannah Mann (born 1980)
 Jenny Lucia Mann (born 1983)
 Ludvik Mann-Aškenazy (born 1956), film maker
 Paul Thomas Mann (1875–1955), Nobel Prize for Literature laureate, married Katharina "Katia" Pringsheim (1883–1980)
 Erika Mann (1905–1969), author, married Gustaf Gründgens (1899–1963), actor and director; married secondly to Wystan H. Auden (1907–1973), poet
 Klaus Mann (1906–1949), author, editor, journalist 
 Gottfried Golo Mann (1909–1994), historian, author
 Hans Beck-Mann (adopted son) (died 1986)
 Monika Mann (1910–1992), author, married Jenö Lányi (1902–1940), art historian
 Elisabeth Mann Borgese (1918–2002), author, married Giuseppe Antonio Borgese (1882–1952)
 Angelica Borgese (born 1940), physicist
 Dominica Borgese (born 1944), biologist
 Michael Thomas Mann (1919–1977), professor of German literature, married Gret Moser (1916–2007)
  (born 1940), professor of psychology, married Christine Heisenberg (daughter of Werner Heisenberg)
 Stefan Mann (born 1968), economist, married Kristina Zschiegner (born 1964)
 Lukas Mann (born 1994)
 Julia Mann (born 1996)
 Konstantin Mann (born 1998)
 Anthony Mann (born 1942)
 Raju Mann (adopted daughter) (born 1963)
 Juliet Mann Ward (born 1999) daughter 
 Julia Elisabeth Therese Mann (1877–1927), married Josef Löhr (1862–1922), banker
 Eva Maria Elisabeth Löhr (1901–1968), married Hans Bohnenberger (1901–1989), bank employee
 Rosa Marie Julia Löhr (1907–1994), married Friedrich Alder (1914–1942), gardener
 Ilse Marie Julia Löhr (born 1907)
 Carla Augusta Olga Maria Mann (1881–1910), actress
 Karl Viktor Mann (1890–1949), economist, married Magdalena Nelly Kilian (1895–1962)

Dohm-Mann family tree
The Dohm-Mann family tree contains a number of famous writers, musicians and actors.  This family tree is not complete but is focused on showing the relationship of the well-known members of the family.

Research

TMI Research 
The metadatabase TMI-Research brings together archival materials and library holdings of the network "Thomas Mann International". The network was founded in 2017 by the five houses Buddenbrookhaus/Heinrich-und-Thomas-Mann-Zentrum (Lübeck), the Monacensia im Hildebrandhaus (Munich), the Thomas Mann Archive of the ETH Zurich (Zurich/Switzerland), the Thomas Mann House (Los Angeles/USA) and the Thomo Manno kultūros centras/Thomas Mann Culture Centre (Nida/Lithuania). The houses stand for the main stations of Thomas Mann's life and his family. The platform, which is hosted by ETH Zurich, allows researches in the collections of the network partners across all houses. The database is freely accessible and contains over 165,000 records on letters, original editions, photographs, monographs and essays on Thomas Mann and the Mann family.

Adaptations 
Heinrich Breloer wrote and directed the 2001 miniseries Die Manns – Ein Jahrhundertroman, which won the International Emmy Award for Best TV Movie or Miniseries.

Literature 
 Naumann, Uwe (ed.): Die Kinder der Manns. Ein Familienalbum. Reinbek, 2005. 
 Stübbe, Michael: Die Manns. Genealogie einer deutschen Schriftstellerfamilie. Degener & Co, 2004. 
 Marianne Krüll: Im Netz der Zauberer. Fischer, 1999. 
 Hans Wißkirchen: Die Familie Mann. Rowohlt, 1999. 
 Jindrich Mann: "Prag, poste restante. Eine unbekannte Geschichte der Familie Mann". Rowohlt Verlag 2007. 
 Die Manns – Genealogie einer deutschen Schriftstellerfamilie in Deutsches Familienarchiv Bd. 145, Degener & Co., Insingen 2005.

References

 
Hanseatic families
German families